Steve Denton and Tim Wilkison were the defending champions but did not compete that year.

Henri Leconte and Pavel Složil won in the final 6–1, 7–6 against Mark Dickson and Terry Moor.

Seeds

  Brian Gottfried /  Frew McMillan (quarterfinals)
  Henri Leconte /  Pavel Složil (champions)
  Bernard Mitton /  Danie Visser (quarterfinals)
  Ilie Năstase /  Adriano Panatta (first round)

Draw

External links
 1982 Fischer-Grand Prix Doubles draw

Doubles